British S-class submarine may refer to:

  British S-class submarine (1914), three submarines launched in 1914–1915 and transferred to the Italian Navy in 1915
  British S-class submarine (1931), sixty-two submarines launched in the 1930s and 1940s